Adriana Villagrán (born 7 August 1956) is an Argentine tennis player, who played professionally in the 1980s. She is also known under the married name Adriana Villagrán-Reami.

Career
In 1980, with compatriot Ivanna Madruga, she reached the women's doubles final at Roland Garros (losing to Kathy Jordan and Anne Smith). She participated in seven Grand Slam tournaments.

Adriana Villagrán represented her country in Federation Cup from 1979 to 1985.

Grand Slam finals

Women's doubles: (1 runner–up)

WTA Tour finals

Singles (2 runner-ups)

Doubles (6 runner-ups)

External links 
 
 
 

1956 births
Argentine female tennis players
Living people
20th-century Argentine women